Vansh is a 1992 Indian Hindi language action drama film directed and produced by Pappu Verma. It is a remake of Mani Ratnam's 1988 Tamil film Agni Natchathiram. The film was well received at the box office.

Plot 
Justice Krishnakant Dharmadhikari is assigned to chair an inquiry commission against Mantri Vilasrao Chaudhary. While gathering evidence against the later, he must also deal with family problems, arising out of his bigamous relationship with Tulsi and Rukmani: Tulsi's children, Geeta and Siddharth; Rukmani's son, Inspector Gautam; the hostility displayed by his aging mother against Tulsi and her children; as well as the growing anger and animosity between Gautam and Siddharth, who have only one thing in common, namely the hatred for their father.

Cast 
 Sudesh Berry as Inspector Gautam Dharmadhikari
 Siddharth Ray as Siddharth Dharmadhikari
 Ekta Sohini as Ekta Chaudhary
 Anupam Kher as Krishnakant Dharmadhikari
 Amrish Puri as Vilasrao Chaudhary
 Saeed Jaffrey as Police Commissioner
 Kader Khan as Havaldar Imaandar
 Asrani as Havaldar Wafadaar 
 Yunus Parvez as Inspector Sher Bahadur
 Beena Banerjee as Tulsi Dharmadhikari 
 Reema Lagoo as Rukmini Dharmadhikari 
 Sushma Seth as Mrs. Dharmadhikari 
 Achyut Potdar as Chaudhary Commission Report Head
 Anjan Srivastav as Vilasrao's CA
Deepak Shirke as Vilasrao's goon

Songs

References

External links 
 
 

1992 films
1990s Hindi-language films
1990s action drama films
Indian action drama films
Hindi remakes of Tamil films
1992 drama films